Brownfield is a city in Terry County, Texas, United States. Its population was 8,936 at the 2020 census. Brownfield is 39 miles southwest of Lubbock, it is the county seat of Terry County.

Geography

Brownfield lies in the center of Terry County, in the southern portion of the South Plains and Llano Estacado. The city rests on a windblown deposit called the Blackwater Draw Formation, which is underlain by a thick layer of caliche, referred to locally as the "caprock". Beneath the caliche layer lies fluvial deposits called the Ogallala Formation, which contains a portion of the Ogallala Aquifer. In early days, climbing the Caprock Escarpment was not easy for horse-drawn covered wagons.

The only terrain variation lies at the south end of the city, where Lost Draw carves a channel that runs across the entire county. Lost Draw formed over 10,000 years ago at the end of the last ice age, when the climate of  the area was much wetter. When the vast glaciers of the north retreated, they left numerous dry river channels crisscrossing the Llano Estacado. When settlers during the 1800s ventured across this area, they often went into these channels expecting to find water, but unless significant rains had occurred recently, their search was in vain, with many of the parties becoming "lost", hence the name, Lost Draw.

The most notable geographic feature of Brownfield is its red soil. The soil creates an almost iridescent red color during sunrise and sunset due to the high iron oxide content.

Climate
Brownfield lies in a semiarid temperate zone, where high winds and extreme temperature variations are the norm. The winters often fall below freezing for extended periods, but snow remains unusual due to very little precipitation forming in the winter.

The most significant time of the year for weather events starts in March and runs through September, when severe thunderstorms form on the Great Plains. Rain, winds, hail, and a few tornadoes are to be expected at this time of year. Late thunderstorms that produce hail are significantly harmful to the local economy, as it destroys the local cotton crop.

Economy
Cotton farming is the backbone of not only Brownfield, but also the entire South Plains in general. Cotton fields stretch for miles, and the harvest season in October sees frenzied activity as harvesters (locally called cotton strippers), module makers, and module trucks are seen all over the county.

A haze also develops over the city as the local cotton gins go to work stripping the cotton from the burr, separating the seeds, and then compressing the cotton into 500-lb bales. The haze is actually fine cotton dust, and sometimes small drifts develop in the street resembling snow mixed with red soil.

Peanut growing has found a toehold on the economy, as have vineyards. In recent years, grape growing has made Terry County a producer of wine grapes used as filler for inexpensive wines. Several wineries are now established in the county, which produce average-to-poor quality wine according to numerous reviews and wine review aggregator websites. Local farmers, ranchers, and landowners began growing grapes here as early as 1950, with a few new wineries near the city due to the repeal of fully dry county status in 2008. Several older and more notable wineries are in the Lubbock area, about 30 miles northeast.

Oil production continues to drop from its previous levels in the 1980s. According to current trends, Terry County and Brownfield will continue to decline significantly in oil production and importance in West Texas.

Wal-Mart chose to not renew their lease on their facility on the eastern edge of town, saying the town was not sufficiently economically viable for them to continue to operate.

Demographics

Brownfield and Terry County have one of the highest rates of teen pregnancy in Texas. The teen pregnancy rate is 98.1 out of 1000, more than double the national average.

Brownfield has an extremely high sexually transmitted infection rate of gonorrhea, chlamydia, and most notably syphilis, which is much higher than the state average (7.8 per 100,000).

Only 61.5% of the population holds a high school degree or higher, 8.9% a bachelor's degree or higher, and 2.7% a master's degree or higher. About 6.1% of the population was unemployed in 2010.

2020 census

As of the 2020 United States census, there were 8,936 people, 3,271 households, and 2,086 families residing in the city.

2000 census
As of the census of 2000, 9,488 people, 3,176 households, and 2,337 families resided in the city. The population density was 1,501.0 people per square mile (579.6/km). The 3,735 housing units had an average density of 590.9 per square mile (228.2/km). The racial makeup of the city was 24.56% White, 6.59% African American, 0.42% Native American, 0.25% Asian, 14.47% from other races, and 3.71% from two or more races. Hispanics of all origins contributed 45.95% of the population.

The city governance consists overwhelmingly of the White population, with only 23.4% of the council consisting of the minorities that are 75% of the population. The White representation is about 75% of the council, while only consisting of 24% of the population.

Of the 3,176 households, 34.6% had children under the age of 18 living with them, 55.3% were married couples living together, 14.1% had a female householder with no husband present, and 26.4% were not families. About 24% of all households were made up of individuals, and 14.3% had someone living alone who was 65 years of age or older. The average household size was 2.68 and the average family size was 3.19.

In the city, the population was distributed as 27.2% under the age of 18, 9.8% from 18 to 24, 27.3% from 25 to 44, 20.0% from 45 to 64, and 15.8% who were 65 years of age or older. The median age was 35 years. For every 100 females, there were 109.5 males. For every 100 females age 18 and over, there were 111.6 males.

The median income for a household in the city was $26,504, and for a family was $32,076. Males had a median income of $23,637 versus $19,628 for females. The per capita income for the city was $13,854. About 21.8% of families and 26.0% of the population were below the poverty line, including 38.7% of those under age 18 and 13.5% of those age 65 or over.

Brownfield is served by a weekly newspaper, nearby stations KBXJ (FM) and KPET (AM), and the various Lubbock radio and TV stations. KKUB (AM) and KTTU-FM are licensed to Brownfield, but operate primarily from offices and studios in Lubbock.

Crime
As of 2019, violent and property crime rates were higher in Brownfield than the national average.

Brownfield News publisher, former head of the Brownfield Industrial Development Corporation (BIDCorps), and 1997 Brownfield High School graduate, Brian Brisendine, was convicted of receipt and distribution of child pornography, and sentenced to 12 years in federal prison on 8 Sept, 2022. Brisendine admitted to trading images of child sexual abuse online since 2014. He admitted to viewing between 5,000 and 10,000 videos and images of child sexual abuse with children as young as four months old.

Education

The City of Brownfield is served by the Brownfield Independent School District, ranked 899 out of 932 districts in Texas with a zero star rating. Brownfield ISD is considered a historically low-performing school district with abnormally high teacher turnover according to the local newspaper.

Brownfield High School was rated "academically unacceptable" by the Texas State Board of Education in 2011.

For the 2012–2013 school year, Brownfield High School State of Texas Assessments of Academic Readiness test scores resulted in the following student passing scores:

23% of students passed writing
45% of students passed algebra
67% of students passed biology
54% of students passed chemistry
48% of students passed reading
 19% of students passed geography

For the 2021–2022 school year, Brownfield High School was ranked among the bottom 15% of all high schools in Texas, with a ranking of 1414 out of 1861 high schools.

Dry county status
Several town meetings were held in 2008 to discuss the issue of selling beer and wine in Terry County. On November 4, a majority of registered voters voted to legalize the sale of beer and wine in Terry County (1533 for, 1211 against).

See also
West Texas
U.S. Route 82 in Texas
Yellow House Draw
Yellow House Canyon
Double Mountain Fork Brazos River

References

External links

Brownfield Chamber of Commerce
City of Brownfield
The Brownfield News

Cities in Texas
Cities in Terry County, Texas
County seats in Texas